Mulberry Grove is a historic home located near Brownsburg, Rockbridge County, Virginia. The original section was built about 1790, and later expanded in the 1820s to a two-story, three bay, brick and frame Federal style dwelling.  It has a side gable roof and two chimneys at the northeast end and one brick chimney near the southwest end. A frame stair hall was added about 1828 and brick wings were added at each end about 1840. The property includes a contributing log meat house and a double-pen log barn.  The house was built for William Houston, a relative of the Texas pioneer and Rockbridge County native, Sam Houston.

It was listed on the National Register of Historic Places in 1994.

References

Houses on the National Register of Historic Places in Virginia
Federal architecture in Virginia
Houses completed in 1790
Houses in Rockbridge County, Virginia
National Register of Historic Places in Rockbridge County, Virginia
1790 establishments in Virginia